Prince Michael Andreas Barclay de Tolly (baptised  – ) was an Imperial Russian soldier of Baltic German and Scottish origin, who was commander-in-chief and Minister of War of the Russian Empire during Napoleon's invasion in 1812 and the War of the Sixth Coalition. Barclay implemented a number of reforms during this time that improved supply system in the army, doubled the number of army troops, and implemented new combat training principles. He was also the Governor-General of Finland.

He was born into a German-speaking noble family from Livonia, who were of Scottish descent. His father was the first of his family to be accepted into the Russian nobility. Barclay joined the Imperial Russian Army at a young age in 1776. He served with distinction in the Russo-Turkish War (1787–92), the Russo-Swedish War (1788–90), and the Kościuszko Uprising (1794).

In 1806, Barclay began commanding in the Napoleonic Wars, distinguishing himself at the Battle of Pułtusk that same year. He was wounded at the Battle of Eylau in 1807 while his troops were covering the retreat of the Russian army. Because of his wounds, he was forced to leave command. The following year, he carried out successful operations in the Finnish War against Sweden. Barclay led a large number of Russian troops approximately 100 km across the frozen Gulf of Bothnia in winter during a snowstorm. For his accomplishments, Barclay de Tolly was appointed Governor-General of the Grand Duchy of Finland. From 20 January 1810 to September 1812 he was the Minister of War of the Russian Empire.

When the French invasion of Russia began in 1812, Barclay de Tolly was commander of the 1st Army of the West, the largest Army to face Napoleon. Barclay initiated a scorched earth policy from the beginning of the campaign, though this made him unpopular among Russians. After the Battle of Smolensk failed to halt the French and discontent among Russians continued to grow, Alexander I appointed Mikhail Kutuzov as Commander-in-Chief, though Barclay remained in charge of the 1st Army. However, Kutuzov continued the same scorched earth retreat up to Moscow where the Battle of Borodino took place nearby. Barclay commanded the right wing and center of the Russian army for the battle. After Napoleon's retreat, the eventual success of Barclay's tactics made him a hero among Russians. He became Commander-in-Chief in 1813 after the battle of Bautzen, replacing Wittgenstein (who had been appointed after Kutuzov's death early in 1813) and led the taking of Paris, for which he was made a Field Marshal. His health later declined and he died on a visit to Germany in 1818.

Early life and family 
Michael Andreas was born as a son of Gotthard Barclay de Tolly (1734–1781) and his wife Margarethe Elisabeth von Smitten (1733-1771). The Barclay de Tolly family were German-speaking descendants of the Scottish Clan Barclay. Their ancestor Peter Barclay emigrated from Towie, Aberdeenshire (Towy or Tolly) and settled in Livonia in the 17th century.
Duchy of Courland and Semigallia (present-day Pamūšis, Šiauliai County, Lithuania) and raised in Beckhof, Livonia, Russian Empire (now Jõgeveste, Estonia), which was his mother's family estate. The commonly accepted birth date of 27 December 1761 is actually the day of his baptism in the Lutheran church of the town of Zaumel (now 
Žeimelis, Lithuania).  

His grandfather, Wilhelm Barclay de Tolly, served as the mayor of Riga, while his father served in the Russian army before being admitted into the ranks of the Russian nobility by the Tsar. From 1765, the young Barclay de Tolly grew up in St. Petersburg and was raised by his aunt. This was a common occurrence among the German Protestants, and it gave the young man an exposure to higher society unavailable in the Baltic provinces.

The future field marshal started his active service in the Imperial Russian Army in 1776, and he would spend the rest of his life with the military. He had two brothers who also served in the Russian army: Axel Heinrich Barclay de Tolly, a Major General of Engineers, and Erich Johann Barclay de Tolly, a Major of Artillery.

Service history 

Barclay was enlisted in the Pskov Carabineer Regiment on 13 May 1776, and he achieved the rank of a cornet by May 1778. In the same year, he joined the Imperial jaeger regiments, and with his unit was assigned to the army of Prince Potemkin. In 1788–1789, during the Russo-Turkish War (1787–92), Barclay served under the command of Victor Amadeus of Anhalt-Bernburg-Schaumburg-Hoym. During this campaign, he distinguished himself in the taking of Ochakov and Akkerman. For his role in the capture of Ochakov, he was personally decorated by Prince Potemkin.

In 1789, during the Russo-Swedish War (1788–90), he was transferred to the Finnish front,. Four years later, he fought in the Polish Campaign of 1794, and was decorated for his role in the capture of Vilnius. He was a lieutenant colonel by 1794 after serving as aide-de-camp to various senior officers in several campaigns. In that year, he was appointed commander of the Estland Jaeger Corps, and three years later commander of the 4th Jaeger Regiment, becoming its chief in 1799, soon after being promoted to general major for his service in Poland.

In the war of 1806 against Napoleon, Barclay took a distinguished part in the Battle of Pultusk (December 1806) and was wounded at the Battle of Eylau (7 February 1807), where his conduct won him promotion to the rank of lieutenant general. After a period of convalescence, Barclay returned to the army and in 1808 commanded operations against the Swedes during the Finnish War. In 1809, he successfully marched over the frozen Gulf of Bothnia, which allowed him to surprise the enemy and seize Umeå in Sweden. For this exploit, immortalized by the Russian poet Baratynsky, he was made full general and Governor-General of Finland. A year later, he became Minister of War, retaining the post until 1813.

Napoleon's invasion 

During Napoleon's invasion of Russia in 1812, Barclay assumed the supreme command of the 1st Army of the West, the largest of the Russian armies facing Napoleon. He used a strategy of retreat leaving behind scorched earth from the beginning of the campaign in order to draw the French supply lines deep into Russian territory and retreated to the village of Tsaryovo-Zaimishche between Moscow and Smolensk, although some consider the strategy merely a confluence of diverse circumstances and not attributable to the will of one man.

Nevertheless, the Russians keenly opposed the appointment of a non-Russian as commander-in-chief. His rivals spread rumors of his being Napoleon's agent, and the populace condemned him as a coward. Barclay was forced by his subordinates and the Tsar to engage Napoleon at Smolensk (17–18 August 1812). Napoleon forced Barclay to retreat when he threatened Barclay's only escape route. After the loss of the "Holy City" of Smolensk, the outcry of officers and civilians grew to a point where the Tsar could no longer ignore it. He appointed Kutuzov, previously a general at the battle of Austerlitz, as the over-all commander of the Russian forces. Barclay remained General of the 1st Army of the West.

Barclay commanded the right flank at the Battle of Borodino (7 September 1812) with great valour and presence of mind, and during the celebrated council at Fili advised Kutuzov to surrender unfortified Moscow to the enemy. His illness made itself known at that time and he was forced to leave the army soon afterwards.

After Napoleon was driven from Russia, the eventual success of Barclay's tactics made him a romantic hero, misunderstood by his contemporaries and rejected by the court. His popularity soared, and his honour was restored by the tsar.

Foreign campaigns 

Barclay was re-employed in the field and took part in the German Campaign of 1813 and the French Campaign of 1814, which ended the War of the Sixth Coalition (1812–1814). 

After Kutuzov's death, he once again became commander-in-chief of the Russian forces at the Battle of Bautzen (21 May 1813), and in this capacity he served at Dresden (26–27 August 1813), Kulm (29–30 August 1813) and Leipzig (16–19 October 1813).

In the latter battle, he commanded a central part of the Allied forces so effectively that the tsar bestowed upon him the title of count. 

Barclay took part in the invasion of France in 1814 and commanded the taking of Paris, receiving the baton of a Field Marshal in reward. In 1815 he again served as commander-in-chief of the Russian army, which after the Hundred Days occupied France, and he was made a prince at the close of the war. As his health grew worse, he left the military and settled down in his Jõgeveste manor (German exonym: Beckhof, Polish: Tepelshof) (in what is now southern Estonia).  

Barclay de Tolly died at Insterburg (Chernyakhovsk), East Prussia, on 26 May 1818 (14 May, Old Style) on his way from his Livonian manor to Germany, where he wanted to renew his health. His and his wife Helene Auguste Eleonore von Smitten's remains were embalmed and put into the mausoleum built to a design by Apollon Shchedrin and Vasily Demut-Malinovsky in 1832 in Jõgeveste.

A grand statue of him was erected in front of Kazan Cathedral, St Petersburg at the behest of Emperor Nicholas I. He is also commemorated by a modern statue in Riga, a full-size bronze-mounted statue by Vladimir Surovtsev in Chernyakhovsk, a bust monument in Tartu, and the so-called "Barclay's leaning house" in Tartu (which was acquired by his widow after his death).

Personal life and family
In 1791, Michael married his cousin, Auguste Helena Eleonora von Smitten (1770-1828), daughter of Hinrich Johann von Smitten (1731-1782) and Renata Helena von Stackelberg (1749-1786). After the extinction of the Barclay de Tolly princely line with his son Magnus on 29 October 1871 (17 October, Old Style), Alexander II allowed the field marshal's sister's grandson through female lineage, Alexander von Weymarn, to assume the title of Prince Barclay de Tolly-Weymarn on 12 June 1872 (31 May, Old Style).

Awards and decorations 
 Order of St. Andrew (7 September 1813)
 Order of St. George - Barclay de Tolly was the second of four full Knights of St. George in the history of the Order. This includes his contemporary, Kutuzov;
 1st class (19 August 1813, № 11) - "For the defeat of the French at the Battle of Kulm 18 August 1813";
 2nd class bol.kr. (21 October 1812, № 44) - "For his part in the Battle of Borodino on 26 August 1812";
 3rd class (8 January 1807, № 139) - "In the great reward of bravery and courage, rendered in the battle against the French troops on December 14th at Pultusk, where he commanded the vanguard ahead pravago flank, with a special skill and prudence kept the enemy at all times of battle and overturned Nadezhda";
 4th class (16 September 1794, № 547) - "For outstanding courage, rendered against the Polish insurgents in the capture of fortifications and by the mountains. Villeneuve";
 Gold Sword for Bravery with diamonds and laurels with the inscription" for 20 January 1814" (1814);
 Order of St. Vladimir, 1st class (15 September 1811), 2nd class (7 March 1807), 4th class (12 July 1788);
 Order of St. Alexander Nevsky (9 September 1809); diamonds added (9 May 1813);
 Order of St. Anna, 1st class (7 March 1807);
 Golden Cross for taking Ochakov (7 December 1788);
 Cross "For the victory of Eylau" (1807);
 Order of the Red Eagle (Prussia, 1807);
 Order of the Black Eagle (Prussia, 1813);
 Commander of the Military Order of Maria Theresa (Austria, 1813);
 Order of the Sword, 1st class (Sweden, 1814);
 Grand Cross of the Legion of Honour, (France, 1815);
 Honorary Knight Grand Cross of the Order of the Bath, (UK, 1815);
 Sword with diamonds (UK, 1816);
 Military William Order, 1st class (Netherlands, 1815);
 Military Order of St. Henry, 1st class (Saxony, 1815);
 Order of Saint Louis, 1st class (France, 1816).

Commemoratives and legacy 

 The Nesvizhskiy 4th Grenadier regiment (the General-Field Marshal Prince Barklay-de-Tolli, Mikhail Bogdanovich's) was named for the Prince in 1880s.
 He was also the namesake of a short-lived Russian fortress in the Hawaiian Islands.
 A statue of Barclay de Tolly was erected in 2001 in the Esplanade gardens in Riga, evoking an earlier 1913 monument that was melted down for military use during World War I.
 Whereas his lineage as a Baltic-Scottish Baron (and as such: Non-Russian) had caused him to be derided by Russian historians in the late 19th and throughout the 20th century in favor of Kutuzov, his image as a leader has undergone a positive reassessment in recent years.
 The main-belt asteroid 4524 Barklajdetolli, discovered by Lyudmila Zhuravleva in 1981, was named in his honor.
 In the West Siberian river shipping company MRF RSFSR (Barnaul) operated steam tug Barclay. 

In 2013, JSC Aeroflot-Russian Airlines received the Boeing 777-300ER aircraft manufactured by the Boeing Corporation, named in honor of the outstanding Russian military leader - M. Barclay de Tolly.

Notes

References

Sources

Further reading 
 
 
 
  At Runivers.ru

External links 

 Barclay de Tolly
 Genealogisches Handbuch der Oeselschen Ritterschaft, de Tolly family tree in the Oesel Noble Corporation 
 Pictures of the de Tolly statue in Riga at sites-of-memory.de

|-

1761 births
1818 deaths
People from Pakruojis District Municipality
People from the Duchy of Courland and Semigallia
Baltic-German people
Russian people of Scottish descent
Russian princes
Field marshals of Russia
Russian commanders of the Napoleonic Wars
Russian people of the Napoleonic Wars
Russian military personnel of the Finnish War
Governors of the Grand Duchy of Finland
Members of the State Council (Russian Empire)
Cavalry commanders
Russian people of the Kościuszko Uprising
Recipients of the Order of St. George of the First Degree
Knights Grand Cross of the Military Order of William
Honorary Knights Grand Cross of the Order of the Bath
Knights Grand Cross of the Order of the Sword
Recipients of the Gold Sword for Bravery
Recipients of the Order of St. Vladimir, 1st class
Recipients of the Order of St. Anna, 1st class
Grand Croix of the Légion d'honneur
Grand Crosses of the Order of Saint Louis
French invasion of Russia